House of Mystery is a series of comics.

House of Mystery may also refer to:

 The House of Mystery (1934 film), a 1934 American Pre-Code mystery horror film directed by William Nigh
 House of Mystery, U.S. title of  At the Villa Rosa
 House of Mystery (1961 film), a 1961 British supernatural mystery film
 The House of Mystery (1933 film), a 1933 French crime film
 The House of Mystery (1923 film), a French silent serial film
 House of Mystery (Vertigo), an American occult and horror-themed comic book anthology series